Linda Christian (born Blanca Rosa Henrietta Stella Welter Vorhauer; November 13, 1923 – July 22, 2011) was a Mexican film actress, who appeared in Mexican and Hollywood films. Her career reached its peak in the 1940s and 1950s. She played Mara in the last Johnny Weissmuller Tarzan film Tarzan and the Mermaids (1948). She is also noted for being the first Bond girl, appearing in a 1954 television adaptation of the James Bond novel Casino Royale. In 1963 she starred as Eva Ashley in an episode of The Alfred Hitchcock Hour titled "An Out for Oscar".

Early life
Christian was born in Tampico, Tamaulipas, Mexico, a daughter of Dutch engineer and Royal Dutch Shell executive Gerardus Jacob Welter (1904–1981), and his Mexican-born wife, the former Blanca Rosa Vorhauer (1901-1992), who was of Spanish, German and French descent. The Welter family moved a great deal during Christian's youth, living everywhere from South America and Europe to the Middle East and Africa. As a result of this nomadic lifestyle, Christian became an accomplished polyglot with the ability to speak fluent French, German, Dutch, Spanish, English, Italian and even a bit of haphazard Arabic and Russian.

Christian had three younger siblings, a sister, actress Ariadna Gloria Welter (1930–1998), and two brothers, Gerardus Jacob Welter (born 1924) and Edward Albert Welter (born 1932).

Career
In her youth Christian's only aspiration was to become a physician. After she graduated from secondary school she had a fortuitous meeting with her screen idol Errol Flynn, who became her lover, and she was persuaded by him to give up her hopes of joining the medical profession, move to Hollywood, and pursue an acting career. Not long after arriving in Hollywood she was spotted by Louis B. Mayer's secretary at a fashion show in Beverly Hills. He offered, and she accepted, a seven-year contract with MGM.

Her stage name was invented by Flynn, who gave her the surname of Fletcher Christian of Mutiny on the Bounty fame. Flynn had played Fletcher Christian in a 1933 Australian film.

In his autobiography My Wicked, Wicked Ways, Flynn states that immediately after Linda Christian's screen test, he offered to pay for her to have a couple of crooked teeth fixed. When he got a whopping bill, he discovered that she had taken the opportunity to undergo major cosmetic dentistry. Years later, when he met her again, he said, "Smile, baby – I want to see those choppers: they took their first bite out of me."

She made her film debut in the 1944 musical comedy Up in Arms, co-starring Danny Kaye and Dinah Shore. This movie also happened to be Danny Kaye's own first film. This film was followed by Holiday in Mexico (1946), Green Dolphin Street (1947), and what was perhaps her best-known film, Tarzan and the Mermaids (1948). She was the subject of a well-known photograph published in the January 1, 1949, issue of Vogue.

Christian was the first Bond girl to appear on screen, playing Valerie Mathis (opposite Barry Nelson as James Bond) in the 1954 TV adaptation of Casino Royale, beating Ursula Andress to the screen by eight years.

In 2001, a Golden Palm Star on the Palm Springs Walk of Stars was dedicated to her.

Marriages and relationships

Christian's fame, however, was largely derived from having been married to (and divorced from) the popular screen idol Tyrone Power (1949–56). The couple married in Rome, Italy, with Monsignor William A. Hemmick performing the ceremony at the Santa Francesca Romana. Christian wore a formfitting gold-damask gown, and the church was decorated with two thousand 'Esther' carnations. She and Power were the parents of singer Romina Power and actress Taryn Power. Romina was one half of the Italian singing duo Al Bano and Romina Power.

A month after she divorced Tyrone Power, Christian was seen with Spanish racing driver Alfonso de Portago, who was married to American Carroll de Portago (later Carroll Petrie). Carroll had recently given birth to "Fon's" second child Anthony. De Portago was dating model Dorian Leigh, mother of his recently born illegitimate son Kim. Linda was photographed with de Portago at the 1957 Mille Miglia car race. The photo shows Christian leaning in to kiss Fon before he drove off and crashed his Ferrari, killing himself, his navigator Ed Nelson, and nine spectators in the process. The press labeled the photo "The Kiss of Death". De Portago was 28 years old. Her ex-husband, Tyrone Power, died the following year of a heart attack at the age of 44. Christian was later married to the Rome-based British actor Edmund Purdom.

On several occasions, Christian and Power were offered the opportunity to work together, but for various reasons each offer was refused or rescinded. The most notable opportunity to co-star together came in 1953, when they were offered leading roles in From Here to Eternity. Power did not want to do the film and rejected the offer. The roles went to Donna Reed and Montgomery Clift.

Christian had a relationship with Glenn Ford in the early 1960s.

Death
Christian died on July 22, 2011 at the age of 87.

Selected filmography
Two items appear in this article's introductory paragraph which are not in the following list.

 The Rock of Souls (1942)
 Up in Arms (1944)
 Holiday in Mexico (1946)
 Green Dolphin Street (1947)
 Tarzan and the Mermaids (1948)
 The Happy Time (1952)
 Athena (1954)
 Thunderstorm (1956)
 Peter Voss, Hero of the Day (1959)
 The House of the Seven Hawks (1959)
 The Devil's Hand (1962)
 The V.I.P.s (1963)
 The Alfred Hitchcock Hour (1963, episode "An Out for Oscar")
 The Beauty Jungle (1964)
 The Moment of Truth (1965)
 How to Seduce a Playboy (1966)
 10:32 (1966)

Bibliography
 Christian, Linda. Linda, My Own Story. New York: Crown Publishers (1962).

References

Sources

External links
 

1923 births
2011 deaths
American film actresses
Deaths from cancer in California
Deaths from colorectal cancer
Mexican film actresses
Mexican emigrants to the United States
People from Tampico, Tamaulipas
20th-century Mexican actresses
Power family
Racing drivers' wives and girlfriends
21st-century American women
Mexican people of Dutch descent